The 1975 European Judo Championships were the 24th edition of the European Judo Championships, and were held in Lyon, France, on 11 May 1975. Championships were subdivided into six individual competitions, and a separate team competition.

Medal overview

Individual

Teams

Medal table

References

External links
 

E
European Judo Championships
1975 in French sport
Sports competitions in Lyon
Europe
International sports competitions hosted by France
20th century in Lyon
European Judo